North Sydney Council is a local government area on the Lower North Shore of Sydney, New South Wales, Australia, established on 29 July 1890 through the amalgamation of three boroughs.

The area is bounded by Willoughby to the north and north-west, Northern Beaches to the north-east, Mosman to the east, Lane Cove to the west and Sydney Harbour to the south.

The Mayor of North Sydney Council is Cr. Zoë Baker, an independent politician, first elected on 10 January 2022.

Suburbs and localities in the local government area 
Suburbs serviced by North Sydney Council are:

History
The area now covered by North Sydney Council originally comprised three municipalities: the Borough of East St Leonards from 1860 (Kirribilli, Cremorne Point, Milsons Point), the Borough of St Leonards from 1867 (Cammeray, Mosman, Waverton, Wollstonecraft) and the very small Borough of Victoria from 1871 (McMahons Point and parts of North Sydney and Lavender Bay). These boroughs lasted until 29 July 1890 when they merged to form the "Borough of North Sydney".

Following a petition submitted by residents in 1892, on 11 April 1893 the Mossman Ward of North Sydney confirmed its separation as the Borough of Mosman, being proclaimed by Lieutenant-Governor Sir Frederick Darley. From 28 December 1906, following the passing of the Local Government Act, 1906, the council was renamed as the "Municipality of North Sydney".

North Sydney Municipal Council first met in the 1885 East St Leonards Town Hall on Alfred Street, Milsons Point, that had been built for the Borough of East St Leonards, and took up residence in the North Sydney Council Chambers on Miller Street, North Sydney, from 12 July 1926.

Post-war council history and Mack era
With the completion of the Warringah Expressway in 1968, a construction that involved the wide-scale demolition of areas in the centre of the municipality, North Sydney was split in two and development in the North Sydney central business district took off. With this development resulting in the destruction of the heritage streetscape of the North Sydney CBD, threatening the character of surrounding areas, several movements of North Sydney residents formed to oppose and manage the pace and extent of development. One prominent group was the North Sydney Civic Group, which came to prominence in the late-1970s amid dissatisfaction with the North Sydney Council. The Council's plans for the demolition of the historic Council Chambers following a fire in 1976, led to further tensions and resulted in the council being turned out at the 1980 elections, replaced by a North Sydney Civic Group-aligned council and Ted Mack elected mayor.

Mack's term as mayor, was marked by a single-minded and innovative approach to the local governance issues facing North Sydney at the time. Mack began his term as mayor by selling the mayoral car to help buy community buses. During his term as mayor, North Sydney Council introduced the "open government policy" which honoured a promise of openness and transparency of council decisions, and established a precinct committee system, which allowed for greater citizen input in council issues. The pioneering North Sydney Heritage Study was released in 1982 and in 1989 the new Local Environmental Plan was gazetted.

With an increase in council revenues, Mack reinvested the funds in a public works program into several new and renovated parks, car parks, childcare facilities, community and sports centres, and major extensions and renovations to the Stanton Library and North Sydney Oval. Infrastructure also took on a distinct local identity, with Council investment on new street signs, bus shelters, colour schemes of public buildings, paving and street furniture. In 1982, council voted to popularly elect the mayor, with Mack being directly elected twice to the position in 1983 and 1987 before retiring in 1988.

With the passing of the Local Government Act, 1993, the Municipality of North Sydney was legally renamed as North Sydney Council and aldermen were renamed councillors.

2016–17 amalgamation proposals
A 2015 review of local government boundaries by the NSW Government Independent Pricing and Regulatory Tribunal recommended that the North Sydney Council merge with adjoining councils.

The government considered two proposals. The alternative, proposed by Warringah Council on 23 February 2016, was for an amalgamation of the Pittwater, Manly and Warringah councils. As a consequence of Warringah's proposal, the New South Wales Minister for Local Government Paul Toole proposed that the North Sydney, Willoughby and Mosman Councils merge.

In July 2017, the Berejiklian government decided to abandon the forced merger of the North Sydney, Willoughby and Mosman local government areas, along with several other proposed forced mergers.

Town Clerks and General Managers

Demographics 

Aboriginal and Torres Strait Islander people made up 0.3 per cent of the population; significantly below the NSW and Australian averages of 2.9 and 2.8 per cent respectively. The median age of people in the North Sydney Council area was 37 years; slightly below the national average of 38 years. Children aged 0–14 years made up 12.6 per cent of the population and people aged 65 years and over made up 14.4 per cent of the population. Of people in the area aged 15 years and over, 41.9 per cent were married and 16.6 per cent were either divorced or separated.

At the 2016 census, the population in the North Sydney Council area increased by 8.62 per cent. When compared with total population growth of Australia for the same period, being 8.8 per cent, population growth in the North Sydney local government area was marginally lower than the national average. The median weekly income for residents within the North Sydney Council area was significantly higher and nearly double the national average.

Council

Composition and election methods

Current composition and election method
North Sydney Council is composed of ten Councillors operating on a Council–manager system of operation, elected proportionally from two wards, each electing five Councillors. The mayor is elected by the Councillors for a two-year term and the deputy mayor for a one-year term. Although the fixed term of the Council is four years, due to delays caused by amalgamations and the COVID-19 pandemic, the previous term lasted from 9 September 2017 to 4 December 2021.

A referendum passed at the same time at the 2012 council elections reduced the number of wards from four to three (Cremorne Ward was abolished) and the number of councillors from 13 to 10, inclusive of the popularly elected mayor, which took effect from the 2017 election. A referendum passed at the 2017 election also altered the system of electing the mayor. Starting in 2020, the mayor will be elected by the councillors from among their members for a two-year term. As the wording of this referendum did not specify a reduction in the number of elected positions in the Council (such as from 10 Councillors to 9), the Office of Local Government required Council to specify a ward structure of equal numbers to each ward: two wards of five councillors or five wards of two councillors. At its extraordinary meeting held on 20 January 2020, the Council voted to adopt a two-ward model on a north/south boundary with the northern ward named "St Leonards Ward" and the southern ward named "Cammeraygal Ward" from the 2021 election.

The most recent election was held on 4 December 2021, and the makeup of the Council is as follows:

The current Council, elected in 2021, in order of election by ward, is:

Heritage listings
  
North Sydney has a diverse range of heritage listings and conservation areas, including those listed on the New South Wales State Heritage Register (SHR), Section 170 Registers (s.170), the Commonwealth Heritage List (CHL), and the North Sydney Local Environmental Plan 2013 (LEP), including:

 Cammeray, 3 Amherst Street: Tarella (SHR & LEP)
 Cammeray, 143 Bellevue Street: Cammeray Substation (SHR & LEP)
 Cremorne, 8 Bannerman Street: Dalkeith (SHR & LEP)
 Cremorne, 380 Military Road: Hayden Orpheum Picture Palace (LEP)
 Cremorne, 53–57 Murdoch Street: Cremorne Girls High School (Former) (LEP)
 Cremorne, 274 Military Road: SCEGGS Redlands (LEP)
 Cremorne, 7 Cranbrook Avenue: Belvedere (SHR & LEP)
 Cremorne, 11 Cranbrook Avenue: Egglemont (SHR & LEP)
 Crows Next, 23 Albany Street: Electricity Power House (SHR, s.170 & LEP)
 Crows Nest, 250 West Street: St Thomas Rest Park (LEP)
Kirribilli, 109 Kirribilli Avenue: Admiralty House, Lodge, Garden and Fortifications (CHL & LEP)
Kirribilli, 111 Kirribilli Avenue: Kirribilli House, Garden and Grounds (CHL & LEP)
 Lavender Bay, 11 Bay View Street: Ildemere (SHR & LEP)
 Milsons Point, North Shore railway: Milsons Point railway station (SHR, s.170 & LEP)
 Milsons Point, 1 Olympic Drive: Luna Park Precinct (SHR & LEP)
 Neutral Bay, 2 Hayes Street: Hastings
 Neutral Bay, 146 Kurraba Road: Hollowforth (SHR & LEP)
 Neutral Bay, 5 Wallaringa Avenue: Nutcote
 Neutral Bay, Yeo Street: St John's Uniting Church and Pipe Organ
 Neutral Bay, Kurraba Road: Anderson Park
 Neutral Bay, Kurraba Road: Former Neutral Bay tram depot and water tower
 North Sydney, 36 Blue Street: Former North Sydney Technical High School (now Greenwood Hotel)
 North Sydney, 20 Edward Street: Graythwaite
 North Sydney, Falcon Street: North Sydney Sewer Vent
 North Sydney, 283a Miller Street: St Leonards Park
 North Sydney, 6 Napier Street: Don Bank
 North Sydney, 92–94 Pacific Highway: North Sydney Post Office (CHL, SHR & LEP)
 North Sydney, 44 Union Street: Kailoa
 North Sydney, 105-153 Miller Street: MLC Building (LEP)
 North Sydney, 128 Miller Street: Monte Sant Angelo Group (LEP)
 North Sydney, 127 Falcon Street: North Sydney Boys High School (LEP)
 North Sydney, 200 Miller Street: North Sydney Council Chambers and Wyllie Wing (LEP)
 North Sydney, Miller Street: North Sydney Oval (LEP)
 North Sydney, William Street: Sydney Church of England Grammar School (LEP)
 North Sydney, 34 McLaren Street: St Thomas' Church, Rectory, Kindergarten Hall and Memorial Hall (LEP)
 Waverton, North Shore railway: Waverton railway station (SHR & s.170)

Council facilities
Kirribilli Neighbourhood Centre
North Sydney Olympic Pool
North Sydney Oval
Stanton Library
Don Bank Museum
 Clark Park

References

External links

 North Sydney Council

 
Local government areas in Sydney
North Sydney